Phil Dent and Billie Jean King were the defending champions but only Billie Jean King competed that year with Vitas Gerulaitis. 
Vitas Gerulaitis and Billie Jean King lost in the final 6–2, 3–6, 6–3 against Frew McMillan and Betty Stöve.

Seeds

Draw

Finals

Top half

Bottom half

References

External links
1977 US Open – Doubles draws and results at the International Tennis Federation

Mixed Doubles
US Open (tennis) by year – Mixed doubles